This is a list of Australian plant species authored by Ferdinand von Mueller, including naturalised species:

A

B

C

D

E

F

G

H

I

J

K

L

M

N

O

P

Q

R

S

T

U

V

W

X

Z

.
Mueller